The Winter Guard is a fictional team of Russian superheroes appearing in American comic books published by Marvel Comics.

The Winter Guard are noted for being "Russia's answer to the Avengers". Several members of the group formerly belonged to the Soviet Super-Soldiers, the People's Protectorate and the Supreme Soviets. Unlike those teams, which were often adversarial towards other costumed superheroes, the Winter Guard is much more heroic and representative in nature.

Unlike other superhero teams, the Winter Guard currently has a rotating pool of candidates to fill one of three roles on the team: Darkstar, Crimson Dynamo and Red Guardian.

Publication history

The Winter Guard first appeared during the Kurt Busiek run of Iron Man in (vol. 2) #9 (October 1998), where they had several guest appearances. They would later appear in Busiek's stint on the Avengers.

The team made infrequent appearance in the Marvel Universe until Jeph Loeb brought them to attention in Hulk (vol. 2) #1. The Winter Guard soon appeared in She-Hulk and War Machine: Weapon of S.H.I.E.L.D..

David Gallaher brought the team back in Hulk: Winter Guard which first appeared as a Marvel Digital Comic and was later reprinted as a comic book. Gallaher returned to writing the team with a 3-issue limited series called Darkstar and the Winter Guard in 2010.

Fictional team history
The Winter Guard were originally known as The Soviet Super Soldiers and appeared in various comics from the mid-1970s. That name lost meaning following the collapse of the Soviet Union in 1992. The Winter Guard made their debut with that name in Iron Man (vol. 3) #9, and fought alongside the Avengers during both the "Maximum Security" crossover, and the "Kang War".

Whilst investigating the murder of the Abomination (who was killed by Red Hulk), Doc Samson, She-Hulk and Thunderbolt Ross encounter the revitalized Winter Guard, consisting of Ursa Major, Red Guardian, Darkstar and the Crimson Dynamo. When She-Hulk points out that Darkstar and Red Guardian were dead, Iron Man tells her that they were replaced with new people. It is unknown if the other members of the team are new as well.

After teaming up with War Machine to fight the Skrulls, the team was later seen clashing with She-Hulk and the Lady Liberators – and again with The Presence and Igor Drenkov. This version of the team uses an old alien ship, from the Dire Wraith race, as a headquarters. They were mentioned by Storm as possible back-up while Rachel Summers was investigating in Madripoor. The Winter Guard was apparently destroyed by The Intelligencia, who tested their ultimate weapon The Zero Cannon on the unsuspecting heroes. However they were later seen to have survived. During the "Monsters Unleashed" storyline, the Winter Guard were seen fighting monsters that were attacking Moscow. The Winter Guard is later reassembled with Ursa Major, Crimson Dynamo, Red Guardian, Darkstar, Vostok, Perun, Chernobog and Red Widow.

Members
Their current membership is:

 Ursa Major – A mutant who can transform into a humanoid bear.
 Crimson Dynamo V – Russia's answer to the Iron Man armor. Dmitiri Bukharin is the current leader of the Winter Guard.
 Darkstar – Laynia Petrovna, a mutant who can draw power from the Darkforce Dimension. She has died once and was later resurrected.
 Red Guardian  – Nicolai Krylenko, also known as Vanguard, formerly led the Winter Guard as the Red Guardian. A mutant with the power to reflect energy at his attackers. The original Darkstar's brother, he has also died once already and was later resurrected.
 Vostok – A robot with the power to control machines. Also known as Sputnik.
 Chernobog - The Slavic God of Chaos and Night.
 Perun - The Slavic God of Thunder and Lightning.
 Red Widow - The product of the same Red Room as Black Widow, Red Widow is the team's contact with the Russian government and has been known to overrule Crimson Dynamo's leadership on this basis.

Previous members
 Darkstar II – Sasha Roerich, a red-haired & short-lived replacement for Petrovna who was bestowed Darkstar's power.
 Darkstar III – Reena Stancioff, who was killed by a Dire Wraith.
 Steel Guardian – Russia's counterpart to Captain America. The fourth Red Guardian (Josef Petkus) briefly used the name Steel Guardian.
 Fantasma – A sorceress and illusion-caster. Also known as Fantasia. Revealed to be a Dire Wraith.
 Powersurge – A nuclear-fueled giant who sacrificed his life to destroy the Russian supervillain Presence.
 Sibercat – A ferocious feline mutant.
 Crimson Dynamo XIII – The identity formerly worn by Galina Nemirovsky.

Collected editions

Other versions
 The Avengers: Earth's Mightiest Heroes tie-in miniseries has the Winter Guard appear in issue 2. They were called in by the Swiss government to arrest Crimson Dynamo, who is being pursued by the Avengers and into a fight with them.  Their line-up consisted Vanguard, Darkstar, Ursa Major, and Titanium Man.
 In X-Men '92 The Winter Guard are called "The People's Protectorate". They consist of Ursa Major, Omega Red, Darkstar, Vostok, and Red Guardian. They are turned into Vampires by Dracula's son, Janus, but rescued in the end.

In other media

Television
 The Winter Guard appears in the Avengers Assemble episode "Secret Avengers", consisting of Red Guardian, Darkstar, Crimson Dynamo, Ursa Major and Radioactive Man. This version of the group work for Central Command, S.H.I.E.L.D.'s Russian counterpart. Crimson Dynamo obtains a key to a Hydra capsule used to imprison Radioactive Man, and attempts to evade the Secret Avengers and Power Princess to get it to the Winter Guard. The Secret Avengers and the Winter Guard meet at the facility, but it becomes destabilized and threatens a nearby village, forcing the two teams to work together to minimize the damage.
 The Winter Guard appears in Marvel Future Avengers, consisting of Red Guardian, Darkstar, Crimson Dynamo, and Ursa Major.

Video games
The Winter Guard appear as playable characters in Lego Marvel Super Heroes 2.

References

External links
 
 Winter Guard at Marvel Wiki
 

Comics characters introduced in 1998
Russian superheroes
Soviet Union-themed superheroes
Marvel Comics titles
Marvel Comics superhero teams